Kargman is a surname. Notable people with the surname include:

Harry Kargman, founder and CEO of Kargo, husband of Jill
Jill Kargman, American author, writer and actress, wife of Harry
Yisrael Kargman, Israeli politician